In rocketry, an adapter is a hollow cylindrical or conical segment which provides a sound aerodynamic and structural connection, either between rocket stages (referred to as an interstage adapter) or between a spacecraft and the top rocket stage (referred to as a payload adapter). It may shroud and protect vulnerable systems such as electrics or machinery of rocket engines/spacecraft from weather or noise caused by running engines. It is discarded during staging.

Examples of Rocket Stages featuring an interstage adapter:

 Centaur (Second Stage of several Atlas-based launch vehicles, from Atlas-Centaur to Atlas V)
 S-II and S-IVB (Second and third stage of the Saturn V)
 The Interim Cryogenic Propulsion Stage (ICPS) of SLS Block 1 is connected to the Core Stage with the Launch Vehicle Stage Adapter (LVSA)

Examples of Rocket Stages featuring a payload adapter:

 (Planned) The Exploration Upper Stage (EUS) is expected to connect large secondary co-manifested payloads SLS Block 1B/2 using the Universal Stage Adapter (USA) a

References

Rocket components